ABPM may refer to:

 Ambulatory blood pressure monitoring, a medical sign
 American Board of Preventive Medicine, a medical organization
 American Board of Pain Medicine